Christina Reinira van Reede (14 August 1776, Utrecht - 18 December 1847, The Hague) was a Dutch courtier and noble orangist heroine. She became famous for saving the orangist general Van der Capellen from French imprisonment in 1813.

References
 http://www.historici.nl/Onderzoek/Projecten/DVN/lemmata/data/Reede

1776 births
1847 deaths
19th-century Dutch people
Dutch nobility
Dutch ladies-in-waiting
People from Utrecht (city)